Clanculus bicarinatus is a species of sea snail, a marine gastropod mollusk in the family Trochidae, the top snails.

Distribution
This marine species occurs in the Eastern Indian Ocean, Indo-Arabia, Oceania, the Indo-West Pacific and Australia (Northern Territory, Queensland, Western Australia).

References

 Angas, G.F. 1880. Descriptions of three species of marine shells from Port Darwin, Torres Straits discovered by Mr W.T. Bednall; and of a new Helix from Kangaroo Island, South Australia. Proceedings of the Zoological Society of London 1880: 418-4
 Wilson B. (1993) Australian marine shells. Prosobranch gastropods. Vol. 1. Odyssey Publishing, Kallaroo, Western Australia, 408 pp
 Jansen, P. 1995. A review of the genus Clanculus Montfort, 1810 (Gastropoda: Trochidae) in Australia, with description of a new subspecies and the introduction of a nomen novum. Vita Marina 43(1-2): 39-62

External links
 To Biodiversity Heritage Library (6 publications)
 To World Register of Marine Species

bicarinatus
Gastropods described in 1880